Aruba competed at the 2020 Summer Olympics in Tokyo. Originally scheduled to take place from 24 July to 9 August 2020, the Games were postponed to 23 July to 8 August 2021, because of the COVID-19 pandemic. It was the nation's ninth appearance at the Olympic Games.

Competitors
The following is the list of number of competitors in the Games.

Shooting

Aruba received an invitation from the Tripartite Commission to send a men's pistol shooter to the Olympics, as long as the minimum qualifying score (MQS) was fulfilled by June 5, 2021, marking the nation's Olympic debut in the sport.

Swimming

Aruba received a universality invitation from FINA to send two top-ranked swimmers (one per gender) in their respective individual events to the Olympics, based on the FINA Points System of June 28, 2021.

See also
Aruba at the 2019 Pan American Games

References

Nations at the 2020 Summer Olympics
2020
2021 in Aruban sport